Hinde Ester Singer Kreytman (31 March 1891 – 13 June 1954), known in English as Esther Kreitman, was a Yiddish-language novelist and short story writer. She was born in Biłgoraj, Vistula Land to a rabbinic Jewish family. Her younger brothers Israel Joshua Singer and Isaac Bashevis Singer subsequently became writers.

Early life and education
Kreitman was the daughter of Pinkjas Mendl Menachem Zynger (Singer) and his wife Basheve (Bathsheba), née Zylberman. Her father was a rabbi and an avid Hasid with a passion for mysticism. Kreitman's mother also came from a rabbinic, albeit non-Hasidic, family. The daughter of the rabbi of Biłgoraj, who was renowned in his day for his intellectual and spiritual character, she had benefited from an education comparable to that of her brothers.

Kreitman had an unhappy childhood. According to her son, her mother gave her to an poverty-stricken wet nurse for the first three years, who left her in a cot under a dusty table where she was visited once a week by her mother, who did not touch her. The dust caused her to go blind, and she only partially regained her sight. Later, as a highly gifted child, she had to watch her younger brothers being taught, while she was relegated to menial household duties. Kreitman's first novel includes numerous scenes depicting the main female character's desires for education: scenes in which she waits with great anticipation for the bookseller to arrive in their town, dreams of becoming a scholar, and hides a Russian text-book from the male members of her family so that they won't find out she is studying in secret. It is likely that these incidents reflect Kreitman's own story.

Career
In 1912, she agreed to an arranged marriage, and went to live with her husband, Avraham Kreitman, a diamond cutter, to Antwerp, Belgium. The events surrounding this marriage are both described by her in Deborah and by Isaac Bashevis Singer in his autobiographical collection In my Father's Court.

In Antwerp her son, Morris Kreitman, was born. (He later was known by his journalistic pen name, Maurice Carr, and his novelistic pen name, Martin Lea.) The outbreak of World War I forced the family to flee to London, where Kreitman lived for the rest of her life, except for two long return visits to Poland.

Her marriage was not happy. She and her husband both worked in menial jobs, and she translated classic English works into Yiddish to earn extra 
money. Although she had been the first in the family to write, she published relatively late in life, her first novel Der Sheydims Tants (Dance of the Demons) appearing in Poland in 1936. It was translated by her son in 1946 as Deborah. Her second novel, Brilyantn (Diamonds) was published in 1944.  Yikhes (Lineage), her book of short stories, was published in 1949. Many of her works deal with the status of women, particularly intellectual women, among Ashkenazi Jews. Other works explore class relationships, and her short stories include several set in London during The Blitz, which she experienced.

After World War II, Kreitman attempted to contact her mother and a third brother, Moyshe, who had become a village-rabbi in Poland and had fled to the Soviet Union with their mother and his wife; their father had died before the war. Although she received two postcards from southern Kazakhstan, in the town of Dzhambul, (today Taraz), no further communication was forthcoming. Forced evacuation of Jewish refugees to Central Asia under extremely harsh conditions was relatively common in the Soviet Union during World War II, and both are reported to have perished in 1946. Her other brother Israel Joshua Singer had died in New York in 1944, but her remaining sibling, Isaac Bashevis Singer, came to visit her in London in 1947.

Her relationship with her brothers had always been complex. Her son tells about how she constantly told him stories about her brothers – until mother and son went to visit them Poland in 1936 when she felt rejected by both and never talked about them again. This feeling of rejection must have been aggravated when Isaac Bashevis Singer refused to help her immigrate to the United States after 1947. He also did not answer letters and failed to send money, although – then far from being the famous and well-to-do writer he would become in his old age – he was comparably secure and Kreitman and her family were in great need.

Kreitman's two brothers are not known to have encouraged or helped her as an author. Her books were never reviewed in Yiddish daily The Forward, for which they both worked. But the deep impression her personality made on both of them is reflected in their work. In Israel Joshua Singer's Yoshe Kalb an unhappy and unstable seductress appears to be modelled on Kreitman, and Isaac Bashevis Singer's Satan in Goraj includes an innocent girl who is crushed by circumstance, who carries Kreitman's features and particularities. (Esther Kreitman suffered either from epilepsy or another physical or mental condition with similar symptoms, and was later in life diagnosed as paranoid.) I.B. himself stated that his sister was the model for his fictional Yentl, a woman from a traditional background who wishes to study Jewish texts. He considered Esther Kreitman the "best female Yiddish writer" he knew, but difficult to get along with. "Who can live with a volcano?" (Hadda, p. 137). And he dedicated the volume of his collected short stories The Seance (New York, 1968) "To the memory of my beloved sister".

Death and legacy
Kreitman died in 1954 in London. Since her death, her works, which she wrote "in support of the Haskalah (Jewish enlightenment) from a female perspective," have been translated into French, German, Dutch and Spanish. Almost her entire small output is now available in English translation. There are only a few works of Kreitman translated into Polish, Kreitman's stories were published in Poland in 2016 (translated by Natalia Moskal). Her biography and works were inspiration of play "Hindełe, the Sister of the Magician" performed from 2017 in Lublin.

Works in Yiddish and English
Der Sheydim-Tants (Warsaw: Brzoza, 1936); translated by Maurice Carr as Deborah (London: W. and G. Foyle, 1946; republished London: Virago, 1983, New York: St. Martins Press, 1983, London: David Paul, 13 August 2004, and New York: Feminist Press, 1 May 2009 ).
Brilyantn (London: W. and G. Foyle, 1944); translated by Heather Valencia as Diamonds (London: David Paul, 15 October 2009).
Yikhes (London: Narod Press, 1949); translated by Dorothee van Tendeloo as Blitz and Other Stories (London: David Paul, 1 March 2004 ).

References

Bibliography
Carr, Maurice. "My Uncle Itzhak: A Memoir of I. B. Singer." Commentary, December 1992: 25–32.
Carr, Maurice. "Kadish Mayn Muter Ester Kreytman." Loshn un Lebn 173 (June 1954): 8–10. (In Yiddish)
Carr, Maurice. "My Mother, Hindele", Introduction by David Mazower, Pakn-Treger 45 (Summer 2004): 44–49.

"Ester Kreytman, o'h." [London] Yidishe Shtime 18 June 1954: 1. (In Yiddish)
Fogel, Joshua. "Esther Kreitman and Her Sketch, 'A New World,'" The Yale Review 73 (Summer 1984): 525–32.
Hadda, Janet. Isaac Bashevis Singer: A Life. (New York: Oxford University Press, 1997).
Kreitman, Esther. "Ester Kreytman's Notitsn Vegn Zikh Aleyn." [London] Yidishe Shtime. 9 July 1954: 3. (In Yiddish)
Norich, Anita. "The Family Singer and the Autobiographical Imagination." Prooftexts, 10 n. 1 (Jan. 1990): 97–107.
Ravitch, Melech. "Ester Kreytman." Mayn leksikon vol. 4 pt. 2 (Montreal: Komitet, 1982): 254–6. (In Yiddish)
Sinclair, Clive. "Esther, the silenced Singer", Los Angeles Times, Sunday, 14 April 1991: BR1, 11.
Singer, I.J. Fun A Velt Vos Iz Nishto Mer. (New York: Farlag Matones, 1946). In English as Of a World That is No More. Trans. Joseph Singer. (New York: Vanguard Press, 1971).
Tree, Stephen. Isaac Bashevis Singer. (Munich: Deutscher Taschenbuch Verlag, 2004). (In German)

External links
Guide to the Papers of Esther Kreitman (RG 341). YIVO Institute for Jewish Research
A Bibliography of Works by and About Esther Kreitman
Books by Esther Kreitman in All Languages
Article on the "Jewish Women's Archive"
The Life and Works of Esther Kreitman
Kreitman Esther on the Virtual Shtetl, Museum of History of Polish Jews POLIN

1891 births
1954 deaths
British Jewish writers
British writers
British people of Polish-Jewish descent
20th-century Polish women writers
Translators from English
Translators to Yiddish
Yiddish-language writers
20th-century translators
20th-century British women writers
Jewish women writers
People from Biłgoraj